Magdy Fouad Hegazy (born 6 August 1953) is the Egyptian former governor of Aswan Governorate, Egypt. He was appointed by President Abdel Fattah el-Sisi on December 26, 2015. He was formerly Chief of Air Defense Staff the Egyptian Air Defense Command. General Hegazy studied in the Air Defense College and graduated on September 1, 1973, and served as a platoon radar officer of an SA-6 platoon. He held many important positions during his career, including leading an air defense battalion, a brigade, a military region and a training course. Hegazy has been awarded several medals and decorations such as the Longevity & Exemplary Medal and the Distinguished Service Decoration.

Military education
 The Main Course
 Brigades Specialized leader Course 
 Battalions Specialized leader Course 
 Main Staff Course 
 Higher War Course number 23
 Higher Course for Higher Military Leaders number 23

Medals and decorations
 October 1973 Victory Medal
 October War Exemplary Service Leadership medal
 Longevity and Exemplary Medal
 Military Duty 3rd level decoration
 Military Duty 1st level decoration
 Distinguished Service Decoration
 25 January Medal

References

External links
 Mod.gov.eg

Egyptian military personnel
1953 births
Living people
Governors of Aswan